Amir Hamed (11 May 1962 – 20 November 2017) was a Uruguayan writer, essayist and translator.

Background and education

Born in Montevideo, he earned a degree in literature from the University of the Republic and a doctorate in Hispanoamerican literature from Northwestern University.

Works

Novels
 Artigas Blues Band (1994)
 Troya Blanda (1996)
 Semidiós (2001)
 Febrero 30 (2016)

Stories
 ¿Qué nos ponemos esta noche? (1992)
 Buenas noches, América (2003)

Essays
 Retroescritura (1998)
 Orientales: Uruguay a través de su poesía Siglo XX (1996)
 Mal y neomal. Rudimentos de geoidiocia (2007)
 Porno y post porno (2009, in collaboration with Roberto Echavarren and Ercole Lissardi)

Translations
 The Two Noble Kinsmen by William Shakespeare and John Fletcher

See also
Uruguayan literature

References

External links
  Biography and works in the H enciclopedia

1962 births
2017 deaths
Writers from Montevideo
Uruguayan people of Syrian descent
Uruguayan male writers
Uruguayan translators
Uruguayan essayists
University of the Republic (Uruguay) alumni
Northwestern University alumni
20th-century translators